is a village located on Amami Ōshima, in Ōshima District, Kagoshima Prefecture, Japan.

As of June 2013, the village had an estimated population of 1,638 and a population density of 18.6 persons per km². The total area was 88.15 km².

Geography
Yamato occupies the central portion of the northeast coast of Amami Ōshima, facing the East China Sea. The climate is classified as humid subtropical (Köppen climate classification Cfa) with very warm summers and mild winters. Precipitation is high throughout the year, but is highest in the months of May, June and September. The area is subject to frequent typhoons.

Surrounding municipalities
Amami
Uken

History
Yamato Village was established on April 1, 1908. As with all of the Amami Islands, the village came under the administration of the United States from July 1, 1946 to December 25, 1953.

Economy
The village economy is primarily agricultural, with sugar cane and horticulture as the main activities.

References

External links

  

Villages in Kagoshima Prefecture
Populated coastal places in Japan
Populated places established in 1908
1908 establishments in Japan